Not Without a Heart Once Nourished by Sticks and Stones Within Blood Ill-Tempered Misanthropy Pure Gold Can Stay is a split EP by pop punk band New Found Glory and hardcore punk band Shai Hulud. This limited edition EP was only available at shows on the "Not Without a Fight" tour with New Found Glory, Bayside, Set Your Goals, and Shai Hulud. This tour spanned from March 25, 2009 to May 10, 2009. However, the EP was not available until the March 26 show in San Diego. Shai Hulud's song featured on this release originally appeared on the band's album, Misanthropy Pure. New Found Glory contributed their song, "Truck Stop Blues" to the release, featured on their last album, Not Without a Fight, produced by Mark Hoppus from Blink-182. 

The title makes reference of the albums: Not Without a Fight (New Found Glory), Hearts Once Nourished With Hope and Compassion (Shai Hulud), Stick and Stones  (New Found Glory), That Within Blood Ill-Tempered (Shai Hulud), Misanthropy Pure (Shai Hulud) and Nothing Gold Can Stay (New Found Glory).

Track listing
 "Truck Stop Blues" – 2:16 (New Found Glory)
 "Misanthropy Pure" – 4:29 (Shai Hulud)

Credits

New Found Glory
 Jordan Pundik – lead vocals
 Chad Gilbert – guitar, backing vocalist
 Steve Klein – guitar, backing vocalist
 Ian Grushka – bass guitar, backing vocalist
 Cyrus Bolooki – drums, percussion
 Mark Hoppus – Producer
 Chris Holmes – Engineering
 Neal Avron – Mixing
 Ted Jansen – Mastering

Shai Hulud
 Matt Mazzali – vocals
 Matt Fox – guitar, producer, backing vocalist
 Matt Fletcher – bass, backing vocalist
 Andrew Gormley – drums
 Greg Thomas – Engineer, Co-producer
 Dave Quiggle – Artwork
 Eric Rachel – Mixing

References

Shai Hulud albums
New Found Glory EPs
2009 EPs
Albums produced by Mark Hoppus
Split EPs
Bridge 9 Records EPs